Martin Bercovici (24 August 1902, in Bârlad – 19 January 1971, in Bucharest) was a Romanian electrical engineer who contributed to the development of energy engineering education in Romania and to the plan of electric networks building of Romania. He served as a dean to the then newly founded Faculty of Energy Engineering within the Polytechnic University of Bucharest.

Biography
After graduating from the Gheorghe Roșca Codreanu High School in Bârlad he enrolled into the Polytechnic University of Bucharest.

Bercovici contributed during World War II to the education of young Jews who were expelled from state universities.

In 1955 he was elected corresponding member of the Romanian Academy and in 1963 he was promoted to titular member of the academy.

Notes

References
M. Olteneanu, C. Rucăreanu, “Martin Bercovici—Un om între oameni“, Publisher of the Romanian Academy, 2001

External links

1902 births
1971 deaths
20th-century Romanian engineers
Romanian Jews
Academic staff of the Politehnica University of Bucharest
Politehnica University of Bucharest alumni
People from Bârlad
Titular members of the Romanian Academy